Hermann Schaufler (7 July 1947 – 1 September 2022) was a German jurist and politician. A member of the Christian Democratic Union of Germany, he served in the Landtag of Baden-Württemberg from 1980 to 2001. In the state, he was minister of the economy from 1989 to 1992, and then minister of transport until 1998, who was from 1996 also responsible for the environment.

Schaufler died on 1 September 2022, at the age of 75.

References

1947 births
2022 deaths
German jurists
20th-century German politicians
21st-century German politicians
Members of the Landtag of Baden-Württemberg
Christian Democratic Union of Germany politicians
University of Tübingen alumni
People from Tübingen